Mint Julep is a 2010 romance film written, directed, and produced by Ian Teal and Kathy Fehl, starring David Morse, Angelica Torn, and James Gandolfini. It is set in small-town North Carolina and follows the struggling marriage of Deirdre, a diner waitress played by Torn, and Leighton, an insurance salesman played by Teal. Morse plays an odd groundskeeper at a golf course who witnesses a murder, and Gandolfini plays a landlord in New York City.

The film's surreal aspects reflect influences from Federico Fellini, Luis Buñuel and Michelangelo Antonioni.

The independent film took more than a decade to produce due to budget restraints. Teal and Fehl spent an estimated $150,000 on the film, much of which came from their personal finances. The filmmakers received some financial backing from Marilyn Perry, an art historian, painter, and former chairwoman of the World Monuments Fund. Perry studied under Fehl's father at the University of North Carolina, where he taught art history.

The film premiered on May 22, 2010 at the Gerold Opera House in Weyauwega, Wisconsin, where Teal and Fehl run a non-profit organization called Wega Arts.

Cast
 Angelica Torn as Deirdre
 Ian Teal as Leighton
 David Morse as Karl
 James Gandolfini as Mr. G
 Susan Aston as Veronica
 Johnny Mez as Gantner
 Kathy Fehl as Muriel

Soundtrack
The film features an original jazz score composed by Tommy James.

References

External links
 
 

2010 films
2010 romance films
American romance films
2010s English-language films
2010s American films